Drybin is an urban-type settlement and the center of Drybin District, in the Mogilev Region of Belarus.

References

Urban-type settlements in Belarus
Populated places in Mogilev Region